Krossá may refer to:

Krossá (Markarfljót), a feeder of the Markarfljót
Krossá (Skjálfandafljót), a feeder of the Skjálfandafljót
Krossá (Bitrufjörður)